In mathematics, the Bendixson–Dulac theorem on dynamical systems states that if there exists a  function  (called the Dulac function) such that the expression

has the same sign almost everywhere in a simply connected region of the plane, then the plane autonomous system

 

 

has no nonconstant periodic solutions lying entirely within the region. "Almost everywhere" means everywhere except possibly in a set of measure 0, such as a point or line.

The theorem was first established by Swedish mathematician Ivar Bendixson in 1901 and further refined by French mathematician Henri Dulac in 1923 using Green's theorem.

Proof
Without loss of generality, let there exist a function  such that

in simply connected region . Then by Green's theorem,

 

Because of the constant sign, the left-hand integral in the previous line must evaluate to a positive number. This is a contradiction, so there can be no such closed trajectory .

References
Henri Dulac (1870-1955) was a French mathematician  from Fayence

Differential equations
Theorems in dynamical systems